Mantua is a municipality and town in the Pinar del Río Province of Cuba.

History
It was founded in 1605 by Italian shipwrecked sailors as Mantua, Cuba. It was founded in 1719 under the name Guane del Norte. In 1866 it was established as a municipality. The settlement of Mantua is a National Monument of Cuba.

Geography
The municipality is divided into the barrios of Arroyos, Bartolo, Cabezas, Coronel Pozo (Lázaro), Fidel Pedraja, Guayabo, Macurijes, Mantua, Montezuelo and Pablo Suárez.

Mantua Municipal Museum is located in the José Martí street.

Demographics
In 2004, the municipality of Mantua had a population of 26,065.

Transport
The town is the western endpoint of the "Circuito Norte" (CN) highway.

See also
Municipalities of Cuba
List of cities in Cuba

References

External links

Populated places in Pinar del Río Province